Paris Métro Line 7bis is the second shortest line of the metro operating in Paris, France. It serves the 19th and 20th arrondissements in the North East of the city.

Chronology

18 January 1911: The section between Louis Blanc and Pré-Saint-Gervais was opened as a branch of Line 7.
1967 : Because of a lack of traffic, the branch became a separate line known as line 7bis.
1993 - 1994: The line becomes the first line equipped with MF 88 trains.

Tourism
Métro Line 7bis serves the Parc des Buttes Chaumont.

Future

The merger of line 3bis and line 7bis, connected through an existing rail tunnel and allowing the opening of a closed station (Haxo), is being studied. The line 7 bis would be extended one station west to have its terminus at Château-Landon. The proposed merger of lines 3bis and Paris Métro Line 7bis was postponed indefinitely in March 2013. In October 2013 it was rescheduled in principle for 2030.

See also
 List of stations of the Paris Métro
 List of stations of the Paris RER

External links
  RATP official website
  RATP english speaking website
  Interactive Map of the RER (from RATP's website)
  Interactive Map of the Paris métro (from RATP's website)
  Mobidf website, dedicated to the RER (unofficial)
  Metro-Pole website, dedicated to Paris public transports (unofficial)

 
Railway lines opened in 1967